Signhild Joensen (born 14 November 2000) is a Faroese swimmer. She competed in the women's 200 metre backstroke event at the 2017 World Aquatics Championships.

References

External links
 

2000 births
Living people
Faroese female swimmers
Place of birth missing (living people)
Female backstroke swimmers
Swimmers at the 2015 European Games
European Games competitors for the Faroe Islands